The Scout and Guide movement in Saint Lucia is served by two organisations:
 Girl Guides Association of Saint Lucia, member of the World Association of Girl Guides and Girl Scouts
 The Saint Lucia Scout Association, member of the World Organization of the Scout Movement

See also